The Silicon Valley African Film Festival is an annual film event held in California. The festival was founded to promote an understanding and appreciation of Africa and Africans through moving images. Nigerian filmmaker Chike Nwoffiah founded the SVAFF in 2010 and has served as its director since. According to Nwoffiah, "People’s understanding of Africa was limited to the Tarzan narratives of Africa as backward, untamed and uncivilized. Those who thought they knew better, at best, saw Africa as a “country” with starving children and a people ravaged by disease and war," and Nwoffiah intended to change that.

History

2013 
The festival ran from October 11–13, 2013, in Mountain View, California. It featured an interactive forum titled African Women in Technology - A Future of Promise, in partnership with African Diaspora Network and Institute of International Education.

2016 
The 2016 SVAFF was held October 14-16 in Mountain View, California, and screened movies including My Mother's Story by Flora Suya and Fastest Woman in Africa - Rwanda’s First Cyclist Woman by Faustin Niyigena. It featured a special diaspora spotlight on Brazil. Hollywood actor Danny Glover attended the festival.

2017 
The 2017 festival ran from September 29th to October 1st at the Historic Hoover Theatre in San Jose, California. Ghanaian-Nigerian romantic comedyPotato Potahto by Shirley Frimpong-Manso premiered at the festival.

2019 
The 10th edition festival took place October 4-6 at the Historic Hoover Theatre. Amongst the films screened was Zimbabwean romantic comedy Cook Off, by Tomas Brickhill.

2020 
The 2020 festival took place online October 9-11. #LANDoftheBRAVEfilm, directed by Tim Huebschle, won the prize for the Best Narrative Feature. Short film Mébét, produced and directed by Ousman Jarju, was selected by the festival.

2021 
The 2021 festival took place October 8-10 in a hybrid form with parts of the festival held online and other parts held in-person. L’enfant de l’autre by Cameroonian-born Patricia Kwende was in competition. Two Good Hearts and Wedding Dress were selected for screening. Ntare Guma Mbaho Mwine won the Cultural Icon Award.

2022 
The most recent festival was held October 13 – 16, at Historic Theater in San Jose, California. Ugandan film Your Turn was selected for screening.

References 

Film festivals in California
African-American film festivals